Annebault is a commune in the Calvados department in the Normandy region in northwestern France. Its population is 466 people (2018).

Geography 
Annebault is located in the pays d'Auge, 17 kilometers from Lisieux.

Toponymy 

The village Annebault was first mentioned as Olnebac in the beginning of the 12th century, and as Ounebaus in 1195.

Several different theories have been proposed to explain the origins of this name. French linguist René Lepelley has proposed that the name comes from the Old Norrois "almr balkr", or "splitting of the elm". On the other hand, Ernest Nègre, toponymist and specialist in Occitan, has offered that it is derived from the Germanic personal name Allinus followed by the Old Norse bekkr. Yet another theory, courtesy of Albert Dauzat and Charles Rostaing, holds that Annebault derives from the Germanic personal name Hanno followed by Germanic bald, or bold. Ultimately, despite this plethora of suggestions, the origins of "Annebault" remain obscure.

History

The vestiges of a feudal moat, possibly dating to the tenth century, can be found to the south of the town, in the nearby forest.

Population

Personalities

Claude d'Annebault (circa 1495-1552) was a French military man who became an admiral and was named Admiral of France in 1544.

See also
Communes of the Calvados department

References

Communes of Calvados (department)